Deleted Scenes is a studio album by American hip hop musician Blueprint. It was released on Weightless Recordings in 2012.

Track listing

References

External links

2012 albums
Blueprint (rapper) albums